A caries vaccine is a vaccine to prevent and protect against tooth decay. Streptococcus mutans (S. mutans) has been identified as the major etiological agent of human dental caries. The development of a vaccine for tooth decay has been under investigation since the 1970s. In 1972, a caries vaccine was said to be in animal testing in England, and that it would have begun human testing soon.  However, intrinsic difficulties in developing it, coupled with lack of strong economic interests, are the reasons why still no such vaccine is commercially available today. Several types of vaccines are being developed at research centres, with some kind of caries vaccines being considered to diminish or prevent dental caries' impact on young people.

Attempts using antibodies
Early attempts followed a traditional approach to vaccination where normal S. mutans was introduced to promote a reaction from the immune system, stimulating antibody production.

Planet Biotechnology developed a monoclonal antibody against S. mutans, branded CaroRx, produced with transgenic tobacco plants. It is a therapeutic vaccine, applied once every several months. Phase II clinical trials were discontinued in 2016.

The International Association for Dental Research and American Association for Dental Research announced a study performed by the Chinese Academy of Sciences which looked at using an inhaled vaccine that uses a protein filament as a delivery vehicle. Trials performed in rats showed an increase in antibody response along with a decrease in the amount of Streptococcus mutans adhering to teeth, leading to significantly fewer cavities observed among the test population.

Attempts using replacement therapy
On a different line of research, Jeffrey Hillman from the University of Florida developed a genetically modified strain of Streptococcus mutans called BCS3-L1, that is incapable of producing lactic acid – the acid that dissolves tooth enamel – and aggressively replaces native flora. In laboratory tests, rats who were given BCS3-L1 were conferred with a lifetime of protection against S. mutans. BCS3-L1 colonizes the mouth and produces a small amount of a lantibiotic, called MU1140, which allows it to out-compete S. mutans. Hillman suggested that treatment with BCS3-L1 in humans could also provide a lifetime of protection, or, at worst, require occasional re-applications. He stated that the treatment would be available in dentists' offices and "will probably cost less than $100." The product was being developed by Oragenics, but was shelved in 2014, citing regulatory concerns and patent issues. In 2016, Oragenics received a 17-year patent for the product.

On rare occasions the native S. mutans strain escapes into the blood, potentially causing dangerous heart infections. It is unclear how likely BCS3-L1 is to do the same.

Another approach is being pursued by BASF, focused on replacing native lactobacillus flora with a variety dubbed L. anti-caries, which prevents S. mutans from binding to enamel.  However, it is not a long-term vaccination in that no attempt is being made to have a self-sustaining population of L. anti-caries.  The intent is that the L. anti-caries population would be frequently replenished through use of a chewing gum containing the organism.

The University of Leeds has also begun researching a recently discovered peptide known as P11-4. When applied to a cavity and coming in contact with saliva, this peptide assembles itself in a fibrous matrix or scaffold, attracting calcium and thereby allowing the tooth to regenerate. The Swiss-based company Credentis has licensed the peptide and launched a product called Curodont Repair in 2013. Recent studies show a positive clinical effect.

DNA vaccines 
DNA vaccine approaches for dental cavities have had a history of success in animal models. Dental cavity vaccines directed to key components of S. mutans colonization and enhanced by safe and effective adjuvants and optimal delivery vehicles, are likely to be forthcoming. Some  believe that the rational target for developing an anti-caries vaccine is a protein antigen, which has  adherent functional and important immunogenic regions.

Bacteriophage treatment
The use of Enterococcus faecalis bacteriophages as a form of treatment for caries has been considered, as they are capable of maintaining persistent stability in human saliva.

References

Vaccines
Dentistry
Tooth decay